Russula pseudodelica is a mushroom in the genus Russula.

External links

pseudodelica
Fungi of Europe
Fungi described in 1926